Theo Lang was an Australian rugby league footballer who played one match as a hooker for the Eastern Suburbs against Balmain in 1934.

References

Year of birth missing
Year of death missing
Australian rugby league players
Sydney Roosters players
Rugby league hookers